American Glory may refer to:

 American Glory (ship), operated by American Cruise Lines 
 American Glory (horse), 1951 winner of Palm Beach Stakes
 American Glory (album), a 2002 album by Pat Boone